The Green Bay Film Festival is a publicly-attended film festival established in 2010 and held annually in early March. The festival celebrates independent filmmakers in Wisconsin, USA, and internationally. One film is shown each week, with the event culminating in a weekend of film screenings held at the Abbot Pennings Hall of Fine Arts at St.Norbert College.

Event history

References

Film festivals in Wisconsin
Film festivals established in 2010
2010 establishments in Wisconsin